Amalia Domingo Soler (Seville, 10 November 1835 – Barcelona, 29 April 1909) was a Spanish writer, novelist, and feminist, who also wrote poetry, essays, short stories, as well as an autobiography, Memorias de una mujer. She is known for her involvement in the Spanish spiritist movement. Her writings are characterized by poetic and delicate style. She is remembered for her book "Memories of Father Germano". She founded and edited a spiritist weekly, La Luz del Porvenir, characterized by its radical views and feminist orientation. She also served as the editor-in-chief of Luz y unión which succeeded La Luz del Porvenir in 1900.

Selected works
 Un ramo de amapolas y una lluvia de perlas, o sea, un milagro de la Virgen de la Misericordia, 1868
 Memorias del Padre Germán, 1900
 Memorias de la insigne cantora del espiritismo, 1912
 Te perdono!: Memorias de un espíritu, 1944
 Sus más hermosos escritos, 1952
 Réplica a la escuela materialista
 El Espiritismo
 Ramos de Violetas 
 Memorias de una mujer
 Hechos que prueban
 Réplicas de Amalia
 La Luz del Camino
 Cuentos Espiritistas
 Las Grandes Virtudes

References

External links

1835 births
1909 deaths
19th-century essayists
19th-century short story writers
19th-century Spanish poets
19th-century Spanish novelists
19th-century Spanish women writers
Burials at Montjuïc Cemetery
People from Seville
Spanish autobiographers
Spanish essayists
Spanish feminists
Spanish magazine founders
Spanish women journalists
Spanish women novelists
Spanish women poets
Spanish women short story writers
Spanish short story writers
Spiritualists